The Open Government Partnership (OGP) is a multilateral initiative that aims to secure concrete commitments from national and sub-national governments to promote open government, empower citizens, fight corruption, and harness new technologies to strengthen governance. In the spirit of multi-stakeholder collaboration, OGP is overseen by a steering committee including representatives of governments and civil society organizations.

History 
The Open Government Partnership (OGP) was formally launched on September 20, 2011, on the sidelines of a UN General Assembly meeting during which Heads of State from 8 founding governments (Brazil, Indonesia, Mexico, Norway, Philippines, South Africa, United Kingdom, and the United States) endorsed the Open Government Declaration and announced their country action plans along with an equal number of civil society leaders. The eight founding members also welcomed the commitment of 38 governments to join OGP. In the first 10 years, OGP members have created over 4,500 commitments in more than 300 action plans. India and Russia had initially expressed intentions to join the partnership, but neither follow through with the process.

Just six months after its start, OGP had grown from eight action plans and 46 participating countries to 50 action plans and 54 participating countries. The meeting in Brasilia brought together countries and organizations united in their belief in the power of transparency, with participation from anti-censorship campaigners in Yemen to reformers using data on primary schools to improve education in India.

A total of 46 members had already published action plans containing over 300 open government commitments. According to then Minister of the United Kingdom's Cabinet Office responsible for public transparency and open data, Frances Maude, Britain sought to "further secure the foundations of OGP as a globally recognized and respected international initiative…. [and to] strengthen the role of civil society organizations, encouraging greater collaboration with governments to forge more innovative and open ways of working."

In 2013, OGP's thematic goals centered around Citizen Action and Responsive Government. In an era of hyperconnectivity, openness and transparency, as well as citizen participation and collaboration, are increasingly viewed as essential components of good governance.

With the adoption and implementation of the 2030 Agenda for Sustainable Development by world leaders at a historic United Nations Summit, including Sustainable Development Goals (SDG) 16 for the "promotion of peaceful and inclusive societies," 2015 marked a milestone for the future of development outcomes and open government. In October 2015, the Government of Mexico hosted the third OGP Global Summit in Mexico City emphasizing the theme of "Openness for All: Using the Open Government principles as key mechanisms to implement the post-2015 development agenda."

In early 2016, OGP launched a new pilot program designed to involve sub-national governments more proactively in the initiative. Later in December 2016, the Government of France, in partnership with the World Resources Institute (WRI), hosted the fourth OGP Global Summit in the nation's capital, Paris, gathering 3000 representatives from 70 countries.

Objectives 
OGP provides a platform for reformers inside and outside of governments around the world to develop initiatives that promote transparency, empower citizens, fight corruption and harness new technologies to strengthen governance. OGP aims to secure concrete commitments from national and sub-national governments that drive open government reform and innovation in an effort to push countries further in the areas of transparency, accountability, and citizen engagement. It is a voluntary partnership that countries opt to join and through which civil society organizations, in collaboration with government, can advance initiatives that they deem in line with their reform agendas.

Open Government Declaration 
The principles of OGP are best explained by the Open Government Declaration. As outlined in the declaration, participating countries are expected to adhere to the following principles:
 Acknowledge that people all around the world are demanding more openness in government. They are calling for greater civic participation in public affairs, and seeking ways to make their governments more transparent, responsive, accountable, and effective.
 Recognize that countries are at different stages in their efforts to promote openness in government, and that each of us pursues an approach consistent with our national priorities and circumstances and the aspirations of our citizens.
 Accept responsibility for seizing this moment to strengthen our commitments to promote transparency, fight corruption, empower citizens, and harness the power of new technologies to make government more effective and accountable.
 Uphold the value of openness in our engagement with citizens to improve services, manage public resources, promote innovation, and create safer communities. We embrace principles of transparency and open government with a view toward achieving greater prosperity, well-being, and human dignity in our own countries and in an increasingly interconnected world.
OGP participants declare their commitment to increase the availability of information about governmental activities, support civic participation, implement the highest standards of professional integrity, and increase access to new technologies for openness and accountability.

Community of reformers 
Rather than establish a worldwide transparency ranking of countries, OGP provides support and encouragement to countries around the world as they champion ambitious new reforms and deliver on their promises "under the watchful eyes of citizens," The community of reformers is meant to "offer support to those in government that are willing and to create a hook whereby the conversations among government and civil societies can occur." This relationship between government and civil society is the cornerstone of OGP. Governments are expected to actively collaborate with civil society when drafting and implementing country commitments, as well as when reporting on and monitoring efforts. The OGP process requires government to consult with civil society and citizens, and the Independent Reporting Mechanism (IRM) assesses the quality of this consultation.

Funding 
Funding for OGP comes from participating countries, donors and development partners.

Member contributions 
In May 2014, it was agreed that all participating governments are expected to contribute towards OGP's budget. Contributions are based on each participating country's income level (according to the World Bank Data). Steering Committee set both minimum and recommended contribution levels.

Donor organizations 
Grants made in 2015 came from Omidyar Network, Department for International Development (Government of the United Kingdom), Hewlett Foundation, Open Society Foundation, and the Ford Foundation. In May 2019, Open Society Foundation announced a potential $10,000,000 funding scheme awarded to OGP with $1,000,000 being awarded in 2020 and an additional $4,000,000 in matching grants within three years if OGP raises $5,000,000 from other partners.

Structure 
As a multi-stakeholder initiative, civil society participation is enshrined in OGP's foundational principles and management structures. Governments and civil society play an equally important role in managing the OGP through participation in the steering committee, OGP's executive management body, as well as at the national level.

Co-chairs

Steering committee 
The OGP Steering Committee provides guidance and direction at the international level in order to maintain the highest standards for the initiative and ensure its long-term sustainability. It is composed of equal numbers of representatives of governments and civil society organizations. OGP's leadership regularly rotates by appointing a new government co-chair and a new civil society co-chair every year. Incoming government and civil society members of the steering committee are selected by their peers.

Subcommittees 
Members of the OGP Steering Committee delegate work to the OGP Subcommittees. There are three subcommittees: 1) Governance and Leadership; 2) Criteria and Standards; and 3) Thematic Leadership. The principle of parity is preserved in the Subcommittees as an equal number of government and civil society representatives serves in each one.

OGP Support Unit 
The OGP Support Unit is a small, permanent secretariat that works closely with the steering committee to advance the goals of the OGP. It is designed to maintain institutional memory, manage OGP's external communications, ensure the continuity of organizational relationships with OGP's partners, and support the broader membership. It also serves as a neutral, third-party between governments and civil society organizations, ensuring that OGP maintains a productive balance between the two constituencies.

Independent Reporting Mechanism 
The Independent Reporting Mechanism (IRM) is the key means by which all stakeholders can track OGP progress in participating countries. The IRM produces biannual independent progress reports for each country participating in OGP. Progress reports assess governments on the development and implementation of their OGP action plans, as well as their progress in upholding open government principles. The reports also provide technical recommendations for improvements. These reports are intended to stimulate dialogue and promote accountability between member governments and citizens.

International Experts Panel 
The International Experts Panel (IEP) oversees the IRM by helping to ensure quality of the reviews, assess procedures and promote findings.

Mechanism

Co-creation 
Action plan co-creation – OGP participating countries co-create a National Action Plan (NAP) with civil society. The actions plans are "the driving device" for OGP as it is the instrument through which government and civil society develop their agreed reforms, or commitments, every two years. The set of commitments aim to advance transparency, accountability, participation and/or technological innovation. Countries, with the active involvement of civil society, are encouraged to tackle new and ambitious commitments as well as build upon past successes. Effective public consultation process during the development of action plans can help build broad support for commitments with a wider set of actors to rely on for successful implementation. OGP participating countries operate on a two-year action plan calendar cycle, whereby countries are continuously implementing their programs. The government must regularly report on its progress and work with civil society to monitor and achieve the agreed reforms. Progress is evaluated at regular intervals by an independent researcher appointed by the OGP's Independent Reporting Mechanism.

Civil society engagement 
The Civil Society Engagement (CSE) Team works to broaden, strengthen and engage a strong civil society network to participate in OGP, particularly at the national level. The team supports national civil society actors to help them make better use of the OGP process – including the design, implementation and monitoring of OGP action plans – for achieving their own advocacy objectives.

OGP Local 
Launched in 2016 as the sub-national pilot program, OGP Local seeks to extend the principles of OGP to the local level. A total of 15 sub-national governments were selected to participate in the pilot program and, with the support of the OGP Support Unit and steering committee, have developed national action plans in collaboration with civil society. They will actively contribute to peer learning and networking activities with other sub-national governments and, like OGP's member countries, will be assessed by the IRM. The cohort later expanded to 20 before further expansion in October 2020, with 56 new local jurisdictions added to the program. In 2022, 30 new more local jurisdictions joined OGP Local.

Open Parliaments 
As OGP continued to expand, engagement with legislative institutions also became more prevalent. In some OGP participating countries, open parliament has become a particularly significant part of the push for more open government, although commitments related to parliamentary transparency, public participation, and accountability are not always co-created in the same process as the country's OGP action plan. The open parliament initiative also benefits from strategic collaborations with the Open Parliament e-Network (OPeN), a global consortium of organizations focused on parliamentary engagement. As of 2020, its members are Directorio Legislativo, the Westminster Foundation for Democracy (WFD), the National Democratic Institute (NDI), ParlAmericas, Red Latinoamericana por la Transparencia Legislativa (RedLTL), and the OSCE Office for Democratic Institutions and Human Rights.

OGP Global Summits 
OGP participants gather regularly at regional and global events to share their findings in person and to strengthen international cooperation. The most significant of these events has been the Global Summit, held annually since 2012. At the 2013 Global Summit, the steering committee voted to skip the 2014 Summit and reconvene in 2015. In addition to providing spaces where participating countries and civil society groups could share information in person, OGP wanted to find a way to showcase standout efforts of global transparency leaders.

Open Government Awards

Membership 

 
 
 
 
 
 (suspended)

OGP Local 

Abuja, 
Akhaltsikhe, 
Anloga District, 
Aragón, 
Armavir,  
Asturias, 
Austin, Texas, 
Banggai, 
Banská Bystrica, 
Basque Country, 
Béni Mellal-Khénifra, 
Bishkek, 
Bogotá, 
Borongan, 
Brebes, 
Buenos Aires,  
Cartagena de Indias, 
Carthage (municipality), 
Catalonia, 
Chepo, 
Chihuahua City, 
Contagem, 
Córdoba (City),  
Córdoba (Province),  
Corrientes,  
Curridabat, 
Detmold, 
El Kef, 
Elbasan,  
Elgeyo-Marakwet, 
Glasgow, 
Greater Karak, 
Greater Salt, 
Gwangju, 
Gyumri,  
Hamburg, 
Jalisco, 
Kaduna State, 
Ketu South Municipal District, 
Khmelnytskyi, 
Khoni, 
Kildare County Council, 
Kutaisi, 
La Libertad, 
Lima, 
Los Angeles, 
Madrid, 
Maipú, 
Makhanda, South Africa
Makueni, 
Manizales, 
Mendoza,  
Mérida, 
Mexico City - Cuauhtémoc, 
Mexico State, 
Montevideo, 
Nairobi, 
Nandi, 
Nariño, 
Northern Ireland, 
Novi Pazar, 
Nuevo León - Monterrey Municipality - San Pedro Garza García, 
Ontario, 
Osasco, 
Ozurgeti, 
Palermo, 
Paris, 
Peñalolén, 
Plateau, 
Québec, 
Quintana Roo, 
Quito, 
Regueb, 
Rosario,  
Rustavi, 
Salcedo, 
Santa Catarina, 
Santo Domingo de los Tsáchilas, 
São Paulo, 
Sarchí, 
Scotland, 
Sekondi-Takoradi, 
Semarang, 
Seoul, 
Shama, 
South Cotabato, 
Sucre Department, 
Sveti Nikole, 
Tangier – Tetouan – Al Hoceima, 
Tarkwa-Nsuaem, 
Tbilisi, 
Ternopil, 
Tétouan, 
Timișoara, 
Tirana,  
Tlajomulco de Zúñiga, 
Tlalnepantla de Baz, 
Valencian Community, 
Vanadzor,  
Vinnytsia, 
Wassa Amenfi East, 
West Nusa Tenggara, 
West Sumbawa, 
Yerevan,  
Yucatán, 
Žilina Region,

Eligibility Criteria 
Eligibility Criteria – In order to participate in OGP, governments must exhibit a demonstrated commitment to open government in four key areas, as measured by objective indicators and validated by independent experts. The four critical areas of open government: fiscal transparency, access to information, asset disclosure and citizen engagement. Countries can earn a total of 16 points for their performance in these four metrics, or 12 points if they are not measured in one of the metrics. Countries that earn 75% of the applicable points (either 12 out of 16 or 9 out of 12) or more are eligible to join. For an eligible country to join, all that is required is a letter from a ministerial representative indicating agreement with the Open Government Declaration and intent to participate OGP, as well as the leading agency and an individual point of contact for future work.

The following countries are eligible, but have yet to express interest to join the partnership as of June 2022.

Trinidad and Tobago had previously been a member of OGP. However, it lost its membership due to inactivity in December 2019.

Withdrawal 

 on May 4, 2016 (due to inactivity)
  on December 7, 2016 (by request of its government)
  on July 1, 2017 (due to inactivity)
  on December 6, 2019 (due to inactivity)
  on March 7, 2022 (due to inactivity)
  on January 1, 2023 (by request of its government)

See also 

 Transparency International
 Transparency Directive
 Transparency (behavior)
 Corruption
 Corruption Perceptions Index
 Anti-corruption

References

External links
 
Open Government Partnership at Facebook
Open Government Partnership at Instagram
Open Government Partnership at Twitter



Intergovernmental organizations
Open government
International non-profit organizations
Non-profit organizations based in the United States
Global policy organizations
Non-profit organizations based in Washington, D.C.
Organizations established in 2011